Frederick Taylor was an English professional footballer who played at inside-forward for various clubs in the period prior to the First World War.

Football career
Taylor was born at Halesowen, Worcestershire (now West Midlands) and started his professional football career  in January 1910 with Stourbridge, playing in the Birmingham & District League. In the summer of 1910, he moved to Yorkshire to join Hull City of the Football League Second Division, where he spent a year in the reserves, failing to break into the first-team.

The 1911 close-season saw a move back to Shropshire and the Birmingham & District League, when Taylor joined Wellington Town. During the 1911–12 season, he gained a reputation as a prolific scorer with 27 goals. This brought him to the attention of several larger clubs, including Coventry City. In the summer of 1912, Coventry City's trainer, Jimmy McIntyre, moved to Southern League rivals, Southampton as trainer under secretary Ernest Arnfield. On arrival at The Dell, McIntyre recommended Taylor to his new club, who signed him ready for the 1912–13 season.

Taylor made his debut for the "Saints" in the opening match of the season, playing at inside-right in a 2–2 draw with Northampton Town on 4 September. Taylor found the pace at first-class level much faster than in non-league football and after only one goal in eleven games, he lost his place to another new signing, Fred Turnbull. Taylor made two further appearances, scoring once more, but spent the remainder of the season playing in Southampton's Southern Alliance team, scoring four goals from twelve appearances.

In the summer of 1913, he moved to Lancashire to join Barrow, then playing in the Lancashire Combination.

References

 

1890 births
Year of death missing
People from Halesowen
English footballers
Association football inside forwards
Stourbridge F.C. players
Hull City A.F.C. players
Southampton F.C. players
Telford United F.C. players
Barrow A.F.C. players
Southern Football League players